Isaac Roy Martin (July 15, 1887 – July 20, 1979) was an professional American football player and coach of football and basketball. He played professionally in the National Football League (NFL) with the Canton Bulldogs in 1920. Martin served as the head football coach at Heidelberg University in Tiffin, Ohio from 1914 to 1916 and John Carroll University in University Heights, Ohio from 1922 to 1923.

Head coaching record

Football

References

External links
 
 

1887 births
1979 deaths
American football halfbacks
American football quarterbacks
Basketball coaches from Missouri
Canton Bulldogs players
Cleveland Indians (NFL) players
Heidelberg Student Princes football coaches
John Carroll Blue Streaks football coaches
John Carroll Blue Streaks men's basketball coaches
William Jewell Cardinals football players
People from Liberty, Missouri
Players of American football from Missouri